Harpalinus is a genus of beetles in the family Carabidae, containing the following species:

 Harpalinus bekilyanus Jeannel, 1948
 Harpalinus flavilabris (Fairmaire, 1868)
 Harpalinus micros Jeannel, 1948

References

Harpalinae